Edgar Warren Williams (born June 12, 1949) is an American composer, conductor, and music theorist.

Williams obtained a bachelor's degree in composition from Duke University in 1971, then obtained a master's degree at Columbia University in 1973, studying with Charles Wuorinen, Mario Davidovsky, and Harvey Sollberger. He then matriculated at Princeton, where he received a Master's in Fine Arts in 1977 and a Ph.D. in 1982 and studied with Milton Babbitt and James K. Randall. He was a faculty member and orchestral conductor at the College of William & Mary from 1979. Williams's compositional work is noted for its orchestrational and timbral complexity, and its use of pitch collections as melodic and thematic elements.

Compositions

Orchestral 
 1969 Of Orphalese
 1984 Landscapes with figure
 1998 Nosferatu: A Symphony of Horror
 1999 Suite on "Nosferatu"

For concert band 
 1968 "To my Father" Prologue
 1978 Across a Bridge of Dreams
 1991 Into the dark
 1993 Now showing!
 2002 Music from behind the Moon
 Prologue

Musicals 
 1970 Music for In the Dark of the Moon
 1982 Music for The Merry Wives of Windsor – text by William Shakespeare
 1985 Music for Richard II – text by William Shakespeare

Choral 
 1975 The mystic trumpeter, for mixed choir and orchestra
 1976 Multum in parvo, for large mixed choir
 1998 Star Spangled Banner, canon for choir
 Missa, For six-member men's choir, brass and piano

Vocal music 
 1985 Three songs, for high voice and piano – text: Margaret Tongue
 1985 The bawds of euphony, for high voice and piano – text: Wallace Stevens
 Two Lyrics, for middle voice and piano – text: James Agee

Chamber music 
 1968 Chamber Piece Nr. 1
 1968 Chamber Piece Nr. 2
 1971 String Quartet Nr. 1
 1980 Amoretti, for viola and piano
 1985 Caprice, for violin
 1996 String Quartet Nr. 2
 1999 String Trio
 Fant'sy I (from "Hortus conclusus"), for 9 instruments
 Fant'sy II (from "Hortus conclusus"), for 12 instruments
 Fant'sy III (from "Hortus conclusus"), for 12 instruments

Piano 
 1987 Six Studies
 2005 Sonata

Guitar 
 2002 Guitar quartet

Electronic music 
 2000 Pentimenti

Publications 
 Edgar Warren Williams: Harmony and Voice Leading, New York: HarperCollins, 1992.
 Edgar Warren Williams: Introduction to Music, New York: HarperCollins, 1991. (Co-authored with Miller and Taylor.)
 Edgar Warren Williams: "Banqueting with the Emperor", in: Perspectives of New Music, vol. 35, no. 1 (1998)
 Edgar Warren Williams: "A View of Schoenberg's Opus 19, No. 2", in: College Music Symposium, vol. 25 (1985)
 Edgar Warren Williams: "In and About Some Measures of Beethoven", in: 19th-Century Music, November 1983
 Edgar Warren Williams: "On Complementary Interval Class Sets", in: In Theory Only, vol. 7 (June 1983)

References

1949 births
Living people
Place of birth missing (living people)
Duke University alumni
Columbia University alumni
Princeton University alumni
College of William & Mary faculty
American contemporary classical composers
American conductors (music)
American music theorists